The Gaziantep Tram is a tram system located in Gaziantep, Turkey. Gaziantep's first tram line opened on March 1, 2011. The tram system carries 75,000 daily riders. The tram system connects the Gaziantep Railway Station with its northern, southern and western suburbs.

History
In 2006, the Gaziantep Metropolitan Municipality's leadership announced that a tram network would be constructed in the city. Gaziantep has seen rapid population growth in recent decades and it was determined that a formal rail mass transit system would need to be designed and constructed in order to address vehicle traffic congestion. The tram was built in three phases now consisting of three unique lines. The first line was between Gar Gaziantep Railway Station and Burç Junction. Construction began on this line in 2008 and was completed in 2011.

Phase Two of the tram system entailed the construction of a  line between Gaziantep University and Akkent. Construction of the second phase of the tram system began in June 2011 and completed in September 2012.

The third stage of the tram network extended from the city center to the western suburban district of İbrahimli. Construction of Line Three began in 2013 and was opened to the public in March 2014. The system was restructured in 2016 to comprise three operational lines. The tram system is operated by Gaziantep Transportation A.Ş.

Gaziantep was the site of a 7.8 earthquake on the morning of February 6, 2023. The incident caused severe damage to the city and killed 3,273 residents. Tram service was suspended between February 6, 2023 and February 10, 2023. Service on all three lines along with public buses on February 10, 2023 with the government announcing all lines would be free to riders until February 27, 2023.

Lines

Line One
Line One of the Gaziantep Tram runs south to north from the western suburbs of Gaziantep to the northern suburbs of the city known as İbrahimli. The line terminates in the north of the city at the Gaziantep Court House. The line consists of 14 stations, runs . Phase one opened in 2011.

Line Two
Line Two of the Gaziantep Tram runs south to north from the norther suburbs of Gaziantep to the city center. The line terminates in the north of the city at the Gaziantep Railway Station. The line consists of 14 stations and runs . Phase Two opened in 2012.

Line Three
Line Three of the Gaziantep Tram runs from the City Center and Gaziantep Railway Station to Ibni Sina in the city's southern suburbs. The line terminates in the south of the city at Gaziantep's new regional medical center. The line consists of 19 stations and runs . Phase Three opened in 2014.

Gallery

References

External links
 Official site

Tram transport in Turkey